There exist several alphabets used by Turkic languages, i.e. alphabets used to write Turkic languages:
 The New Turkic Alphabet (Yañalif) in use in the 1930s USSR (Latin)
 The Common Turkic Alphabet, proposed by Turkic Council to unify scripts in Turkic languages (Latin)

Current languages 
 Any alphabet in use for writing Turkic languages:

Extinct languages 
The medieval Old Turkic script (Göktürk script, Orkhon script, Orkhon-Yenisey script, ISO 15924: Orkh) for Old Turkic language
Old Uyghur alphabet for Old Uyghur language
Cuman language (Latn)
Karamanli Turkish written in Greek script

References

Turkic languages
 *